Dermacentor albipictus, the winter tick, is a species of hard tick that parasitizes many different mammal species in North America. It is commonly associated with cervid species such as elk (Cervus canadensis), white-tailed deer (Odocoileus virginianus), mule deer (O. hemionus) and caribou (Rangifer tarandus) but is primarily known as a serious pest of moose (Alces alces). As early as 1909, Ernest Thompson Seton described the winter tick as a greater enemy of the moose than were "wolves, bears, and cougars." 

The tick can be found all across North America, and has a large geographic distribution. While it can be found in several different habitats, it is often located in areas with a presence of moose.

Some evidence indicates that increasing populations of the winter tick may be responsible for a steep decline in the eastern moose population throughout the southern half of their range. 
In recent years, heavy infestations up to 75,000 ticks have been seen on single moose, and can lead to the death of the animal.

Description 
The winter tick is sexually dimorphic, with adult females larger than the males. The adult female is mostly reddish-brown, but with a white dorsal shield behind the head. The smaller adult male is dark brown with some white markings.

Lifecycle 
The lifecycle of D. albipictus lasts for about a year, and it is a single-host tick. This means that the entire lifecycle of the tick (larvae, nymphs, and adults) progresses on a single host animal. First, in late summer, larvae hatch from eggs. After lying dormant for some time, they start to ascend vegetation and to group in clusters on plants up to 1.25 m in height. This allows them to latch onto animals that pass by and begin to feed on their hosts. While on a host, the larvae go through the nymphal stage and then finally transform into adults. 

Larvae became nymphs about 10 days after being applied to the moose. Nymphs then undergo a long diapause before becoming adults in roughly mid-February. One moose, which had been infected with larvae 37 days after the others, still showed a similar timing of adult ticks appearing. The diapause may serve to delay maturity  until the onset of warmer weather, as has been seen in other species of ticks. 

During late winter, the ticks mate, and blood-filled females drop off the host to lay their eggs and die. For captive moose observed in Ontario in 1988, tick detachment occurred in late March to early April.

Effect on ecosystems 
Tick populations and their effects on moose have been observed to vary from year to year. Winters that are shorter and warmer have been shown to correlate with increased numbers of ticks in moose populations.

The tick not only affects moose, but also other wildlife that can be connected with the moose. In 2001, the moose abundance on Isle Royale was around 1200, but due to the ticks, the moose population fell to around 400 in 2007. With the decreased moose population, the main food source of the moose--various shrubs species and balsam fir--has had an increase in abundance.

References

Arachnids of North America
Ticks
Ixodidae
Animals described in 1869